Cornholme railway station served the village of Cornholme in West Yorkshire, England on the Copy Pit line.  The station was opened by the Lancashire and Yorkshire Railway in July 1878 (nearly thirty years after the line itself) and closed by the LMS on 26 September 1938.  The line remains in use for passenger trains between York/Leeds and Blackpool, which run non-stop between Hebden Bridge and Burnley, and also for trains between Manchester and Blackburn, via Todmorden, utilising the reinstated Todmorden Curve.

With the re-opening of the Todmorden Curve, there is now a campaign to open a station again at Cornholme. The Campaign group CRAG (Cornholme Rail Action Group) have not stated where the new station would be located.

References

External links
 Cornholme station (shown closed) on navigable 1947 O. S. map

Disused railway stations in Calderdale
Former Lancashire and Yorkshire Railway stations
Railway stations in Great Britain opened in 1878
Railway stations in Great Britain closed in 1938